Clarence C. Hoffman (born August 7, 1933) served in the Iowa House of Representatives 1998–2008, most recently from the 55th District.

In his final Iowa House term, Mr. Hoffman served on the Commerce committee; the Local Government committee, the Economic Growth committee, where he was the ranking member, and on the Economic Development Appropriations Subcommittee.

Hoffman was re-elected in 2006 with 6,297 votes, running unopposed.

Early life and education
Hoffman was born and raised in Leola, South Dakota. He graduated from Leola High School and obtained his BS from South Dakota State University.

Career
Outside from his political career, Hoffman is an insurance agent.

Organizations
Hoffman is a member of the following organizations:
St. John's Lutheran Church 
Independent Insurance Agents of Iowa
Crawford County Development Committee
County Risk Management Services

Family
Hoffman is married to his wife Lynn and together they have two children. He and his wife live in Charter Oak, Iowa.

References

External links
 
 Hoffman's Iowa House Web Address
 

Republican Party members of the Iowa House of Representatives
Living people
1933 births
South Dakota State University alumni
People from McPherson County, South Dakota
People from Crawford County, Iowa